The Cherkaskul culture - archaeological culture of the Bronze Age, situated in the south of the Ural and Western Siberia. Named after the village Cherkaskul located Kaslinsky District of Chelyabinsk Oblast. Opened K.V.Salnikov in 1964.

Origin
May be ancestral to the Ugrian peoples.

The ancestors of Cherkaskul culture were population of Ayat culture, which was located in what is now the north of the Sverdlovsk Oblast. The Cherkaskul culture's  population interacted with the tribes of Andronovo culture.

Links

References

History of Ural
Bronze Age cultures of Asia
Finno-Ugric archaeological cultures
Archaeological cultures of Northern Asia